Al Maftah al-Alla is a sub-district located in al-Nadirah District, Ibb Governorate, Yemen. Al Maftah al-Alla had a population of 6329 according to the 2004 census.

References 

Sub-districts in An Nadirah District